Derek Keith Hill (November 4, 1967 – January 21, 2012) was an American football wide receiver who played two seasons with the Pittsburgh Steelers of the National Football League (NFL). He was drafted by the Steelers in the third round of the 1989 NFL Draft. Hill played college football at the University of Arizona and attended Carson High School in Carson, California. He was also a member of the Toronto Argonauts, Shreveport Pirates, Amsterdam Admirals, Scottish Claymores and Anaheim Piranhas.

References

External links
Just Sports Stats

1967 births
2012 deaths
Players of American football from Detroit
American football wide receivers
Canadian football wide receivers
African-American players of American football
African-American players of Canadian football
Arizona Wildcats football players
Pittsburgh Steelers players
Toronto Argonauts players
Shreveport Pirates players
Amsterdam Admirals players
Scottish Claymores players
Anaheim Piranhas players
Carson High School (Carson, California) alumni
20th-century African-American sportspeople
21st-century African-American people